Alzheimer's Research & Therapy is a monthly peer-reviewed medical journal covering research on Alzheimer's disease. It was established in 2009 and is published by  BioMed Central. The editors-in-chief are Douglas R. Galasko (University of California, San Diego), Todd E. Golde (University of Florida), and Philip Scheltens (VU University Medical Center).

Abstracting and indexing 
The journal is abstracted and indexed in Chemical Abstracts Service, Embase, Science Citation Index Expanded, and Scopus. According to the Journal Citation Reports the journal has a 2015 impact factor of 5.197.

References

External links 
 

BioMed Central academic journals
Alzheimer's disease research
Alzheimer's disease journals
Monthly journals
English-language journals
Publications established in 2009